Peleg Coffin Jr. (November 3, 1756 – March 6, 1805) was an American financier, insurer, and politician from Nantucket and Boston, Massachusetts.

Early life
Coffin was born in Nantucket in the Province of Massachusetts Bay to a whaling family; his parents were Peleg and Elizabeth (Hussey) Coffin. Coffin's father was lost at sea a month after he was born. This early background led him to found and head the New England Marine Insurance Company.

Public service
Coffin served in the Massachusetts House of Representatives in 1783–1784, and in 1789, and in the Massachusetts Senate from 1785 to 1787, 1789 to 1792, and 1795 to 1796.  He was elected to represent Massachusetts in the United States House of Representatives in the 3rd United States Congress from March 4, 1793, to March 3, 1795.  Coffin was the Treasurer and Receiver-General of Massachusetts from 1797 to 1801.

References

External links

 

1756 births
1805 deaths
Massachusetts state senators
Members of the Massachusetts House of Representatives
Members of the United States House of Representatives from Massachusetts
Politicians from Boston
People from Nantucket, Massachusetts
State treasurers of Massachusetts
Burials at Mount Auburn Cemetery
People of colonial Massachusetts